Quartz is a dance production duo of Ronnie Herel and Dave Rawlings, known for its collaboration with Clubland on "Let's Get Busy",  which went to number one on the U.S. Billboard Hot Dance Club Play chart in 1990.

Its album Perfect Timing, produced the early 1990s dance hit "Meltdown", and also teamed them with Dina Carroll on a number of tracks, most notably a cover of "It's Too Late". Its records were released on the Vertigo Records/PolyGram label.

Discography

Albums
Perfect Timing (1991)

Singles

References

See also
List of number-one dance hits (United States)
List of artists who reached number one on the US Dance chart
List of performances on Top of the Pops

English electronic music duos
English dance music groups
Mercury Records artists
Record production duos